Stanley Freeman (April 3, 1920 – January 13, 2001) was an American composer, pianist, lyricist, musical arranger, conductor, and studio musician.

Biography
Born in Waterbury, Connecticut, Freeman studied classical piano in college and earned a Bachelor of Music degree from the University of Hartford. After serving in World War II, he joined Tex Beneke's big band, eventually leaving to perform as a pianist and later a comic in nightclubs.

Freeman's work as a studio musician included sessions with Frank Sinatra, Peggy Lee, Ella Fitzgerald, Percy Faith, Mabel Mercer, Charlie Parker, and Rosemary Clooney, for whom he played harpsichord on her hit "Come on-a My House." He also played harpsichord on Faith's "Delicado", a no. 1 hit in 1952.

Freeman's first Broadway project was the 1964 Buddy Hackett vehicle I Had a Ball. He also composed the score for Lovely Ladies, Kind Gentlemen, the short-lived 1970 musical adaptation of The Teahouse of the August Moon.

Freeman conducted Broadway concerts for Marlene Dietrich in 1967 and 1968 and provided arrangements for three of Michael Feinstein's Broadway outings.

Freeman was nominated for the 1992 Drama Desk Award for Outstanding Solo Performance/One Person Show for At Wit's End, a tribute to Oscar Levant.

Freeman's television work included composing special musical material for Carol Burnett and Mary Tyler Moore. With Arthur Malvin he shared the Emmy Award for Outstanding Achievement in Special Musical Material for the mini-musical Hi-Hat performed by Burnett with guest Fred Astaire on the January 8, 1978 episode of her eponymous television variety series.

Freeman's solo recordings include Piano Sweethearts, Piano Moods, Come on-a Stan's house: Stan Freeman at the Harpsichord, Fascination, Manhattan, At the Blue Angel, and Everybody's Twistin'.

Freeman died of emphysema in Los Angeles, California.

See also 
 List of jazz arrangers
 Secrets Every Smart Traveler Should Know, musical comedy revue

References

External links
 

1920 births
2001 deaths
American male composers
American lyricists
American male conductors (music)
Cool jazz arrangers
Emmy Award winners
People from Waterbury, Connecticut
University of Hartford alumni
American military personnel of World War II
Deaths from emphysema
Songwriters from Connecticut
20th-century American composers
20th-century American conductors (music)
20th-century American male musicians
American male jazz musicians
American jazz pianists
American male songwriters